Amato Ciciretti (born 31 December 1993) is an Italian professional footballer who plays as a forward for  club Ascoli, on loan from Pordenone.

Career
Born in Rome, Ciciretti joined the youth ranks of S.S. Lazio at age eight and moved to A.S. Roma three years later. He made his professional debut on 2 September 2012 in the Serie C while on loan at Carrarese. He then had a series of loan spells at L'Aquila, Pistoiese and Messina before transferring to Benevento in 2015. He was a starter in Benevento's promotion campaign in the 2016–17 Serie B, making 35 appearances and scoring six goals. He made his Serie A debut on 20 August 2017 scoring a goal in a 2–1 away loss to Sampdoria. In January 2018, he was sent on loan to Parma and participated in the team's promotion campaign in the 2017–18 Serie B.

Napoli 
On 1 July 2018, Ciciretti joined S.S.C. Napoli on a five-year contract. He was sent again on loan to Parma for the 2018–19 season.

On 25 January 2019, Ciciretti joined to Ascoli on loan until 30 June 2019.

On 9 January 2020, Ciciretti joined Serie B club Empoli on loan with an option to buy.

On 5 October 2020, he was loaned to Chievo in Serie B.

Pordenone 
On 6 August 2021, Pordenone announced the signing of Ciciretti on a three-year deal from Napoli.

On 26 January 2022, he joined Como on loan until the end of the season, with an option to buy.

Ascoli 
On 7 July 2022, Ciciretti returned to Ascoli on loan with an obligation to buy.

Career statistics

Club

References

1993 births
Footballers from Rome
Living people
Italian footballers
Italy youth international footballers
Serie A players
Serie B players
A.S. Roma players
Carrarese Calcio players
L'Aquila Calcio 1927 players
U.S. Pistoiese 1921 players
A.C.R. Messina players
Benevento Calcio players
Parma Calcio 1913 players
S.S.C. Napoli players
Ascoli Calcio 1898 F.C. players
Empoli F.C. players
A.C. ChievoVerona players
Pordenone Calcio players
Como 1907 players
Association football forwards